Joanna Francesa is a 1973 French-Brazilian romantic drama film directed by Carlos Diegues and starring Jeanne Moreau, Eliezer Gomes and Carlos Kroeber. In the 1930s, Joanna, the owner of a brothel in São Paulo, goes to Alagoas and falls in love with a customer.

Cast
 Jeanne Moreau - Joanna
 Eliezer Gomes - Gismundo
 Carlos Kroeber - Aureliano
 Ney Santanna - Honório
 Tetê Maciel - Dorinha
 Helber Rangel - Lianinho
 Beto Leão - Ricardo
 Lélia Abramo - Olímpia
 Leina Krespi - Das Dores
 Pierre Cardin - Pierre

References

External links
 

1973 romantic drama films
1973 films
Brazilian romantic drama films
Films directed by Carlos Diegues
Films set in the 1930s
French romantic drama films
1970s Portuguese-language films
1970s French films